Qiao Xin (born 23 November 1993), also known as Bridgette Qiao, is a Chinese actress who graduated from the Central Academy of Drama. Qiao is recognized for her role as Guan Ju'er in Ode to Joy (2016) and Ode to Joy 2 (2017).

Career
In 2012, Qiao made her acting debut in the television series Qi Jiu He Kai.

In 2015, Qiao gained recognition for her role in the acclaimed historical wuxia drama Nirvana in Fire. The following year, Qiao rose to fame for her role as Guan Ju'er in the metropolitan drama Ode to Joy. She also starred in the historical fantasy drama Legend of Nine Tails Fox, receiving positive reviews for her performance.

In 2017, Qiao reprised her role in the second season of Ode to Joy; her new pairing with actor Deng Lun received positive reviews from the audience. The same year, she starred in the second season of Nirvana in Fire, playing a totally new character from the first season.

In 2019, Qiao starred in the youth workplace drama In Youth as the female lead. The same year, she starred in the romance comedy drama My Girlfriend.

Filmography

Film

Television series

Television show

Music Video

Discography

Singles

Awards and nominations

References

1993 births
Chinese film actresses
Chinese television actresses
21st-century Chinese actresses
Living people
Actresses from Harbin
Central Academy of Drama alumni